Velyka Oleksandrivka Raion was one of the 18 administrative raions (a district) of Kherson Oblast in southern Ukraine. Its administrative center was located in the urban-type settlement of Velyka Oleksandrivka. The raion was abolished on 18 July 2020 as part of the administrative reform of Ukraine, which reduced the number of raions of Kherson Oblast to five. The area of Velyka Oleksandrivka Raion was merged into Beryslav Raion. The last estimate of the raion population was 

At the time of disestablishment, the raion consisted of three hromadas:
 Borozenske rural hromada with the administration in the selo of Borozenske;
 Kalynivske settlement hromada with the administration in the urban-type settlement of Kalynivske;
 Velyka Oleksandrivka settlement hromada with the administration in Velyka Oleksandrivka.

List of villages 

 Zelenyi Hai

References

Former raions of Kherson Oblast
1923 establishments in Ukraine
Ukrainian raions abolished during the 2020 administrative reform